John C. Walker was a physician and prominent Democrat political figure in Indianapolis, Indiana during the American Civil War.  In 1861, he was commissioned colonel in command of the 35th Indiana Infantry Regiment ("First Irish").  Disagreements with his superiors, including Governor Morton, led to his removal from command and the issuance of an order for his arrest.  He was returned to Indiana on an excuse of medical infirmity.  He later participated in Copperhead activity in Indiana, the discovery of which forced him to flee to the United Kingdom for the duration of the war.  He returned after hostilities had ceased and resumed practice as a physician.

References
Griffin, T. K. 1992.  The 1st Irish, 35th Indiana Volunteer Infantry Regiment, 1861-1865 : a military, political and social history. Thesis, Butler University, Indianapolis, Indiana.

Year of birth missing
Year of death missing
People of Indiana in the American Civil War
Indiana Democrats
Union Army colonels